Mark Hill (born 1975) is a British antiques expert, TV presenter, author and publisher.

Early life and education 
Educated at Cranmore Preparatory School in West Horsley and the Royal Grammar School, Guildford, he studied History of Art & Architecture at the University of Reading.

Career 
In 1996, he joined Bonhams as a porter, and then became a Junior Cataloguer in their Collectors Department. He moved on to join Sotheby's in London as a Specialist in their Collectors Department.

In 2001, he joined Internet company icollector.com, rising to become Director of Auction House Services.

He has contributed to DK Collectables Price Guide (by Judith Miller) and was the co-author of the annual Miller's Collectables Price Guide from 2009 to 2017. He has also contributed to a number of other titles in association with Miller including Buy, Keep or Sell? for the Reader's Digest, Decorative Arts and DK Collectors' Guide: 20thC Glass.

In 2006, he founded his own publishing company, Mark Hill Publishing Ltd, specialising in producing books on new and developing areas in 20th century design.

He is the antiques columnist for the Daily Mail, and has lectured widely, including at the Victoria and Albert Museum in London. He is also a member of the vetting committees for a number of major international fairs, including the Olympia Fine Art & Antiques Fair and the British Antiques Dealers' Association's annual fair. He is a member of the British Antiques Dealers' Association and an accredited lecturer of The Arts Society. He was also a co-founder of Antiques Young Guns, a website and internet-based association that promotes young people working in the Antiques Trade, In 2010, he fronted National Antiques Week, organised by Antiques Are Green. In 2014 he rediscovered the copper etching plates for a series of etchings by Pierre-Georges Jeanniot inspired by Francisco Goya and Jacques Callot and covering The Rape of Belgium, which he restored and published after they were banned in 1915 and subsequently lost.

Television 
He has been a specialist in the miscellaneous and collectables teams on the BBC Antiques Roadshow since 2007, and regularly appears on the show. He has also co-presented four primetime television series for BBC2; Cracking Antiques with Kathryn Rayward in 2010, and Antiques Uncovered with Lucy Worsley in 2012. In 2014, he co-presented Collectaholics, a new primetime BBC2 series, with Mel Giedroyc. He co-presented a second series of Collectaholics with Jasmine Harman on primetime BBC2 in 2015.

Other information 
Hill lives in London with his partner. He was a Patron of the King's Lynn Arts Centre, and is now a Freeman of the City of London, and a Freeman of the City of London Worshipful Company of Arts Scholars. He is a member of the Groucho Club.

Publications 
Published via Mark Hill Publishing Ltd
Fat Lava: West German Ceramics of the 1960s & 70s (2006, second edition 2010, third revised and enlarged edition 2012, fourth revised and enlarged edition 2016, fifth revised edition 2018) 
Michael Harris: Mdina Glass & Isle of Wight Studio Glass (2006) 
Frank Thrower & Dartington Glass (2007) 
Hi Sklo Lo Sklo: Post War Czech Glass Design (2008) 
The Journal of the Glass Association (2008)
Caithness Glass: Loch, Heather & Peat (2011) 
Alla Moda: Italian Ceramics of the 1950s–70s (2012) 
The Canny Collector (2013) 
Berànek & Skrdlovice: Legends of Czech Glass by Robert Bevan Jones & Jindrich Parik (General Editor & Publisher) 
The Horrors of War by Pierre-Georges Jeanniot (2014) Sklo: Czech Glass Design from the 1950s–70s (2017) 

Published by Miller's, an imprint of Octopus Books (a division of Hachette Livre):Miller's Collectables Handbook & Price Guide 2014–2015 Miller's Collectables Handbook 2012–13 Miller's Collectables Handbook 2010–11 Miller's Collectables Price Guide 2009 

Published by Mitchell Beazley, an imprint of Octopus Books (a division of Hachette Livre:Cracking Antiques (2010) 

Published by Dorling Kindersley:DK Collectables Price Guide 2008'' 

Published by Lund Humphries

 Sam Herman (Contributing Author) (2019)

References

External links 
 Mark Hill Publishing

1975 births
Living people
People educated at Royal Grammar School, Guildford
Antiques experts
BBC television presenters